Kirch Jesar is a municipality  in the Ludwigslust-Parchim district, in Mecklenburg-Vorpommern, Germany. The village was first mentioned in 1371.

References

Ludwigslust-Parchim